Joyram Engleng is a Bharatiya Janata Party politician from Karbi Anglong district of Assam. He is the former Chief Executive Member of the Karbi Anglong Autonomous Council and has fielded as the candidate from the Autonomous District constituency (reserved for Scheduled Tribes) by his party in the 2014 Indian general election.

References

National Democratic Alliance candidates in the 2014 Indian general election
Living people
Year of birth missing (living people)
Bharatiya Janata Party politicians from Assam
Assam MLAs 2016–2021
Members of the Assam Legislative Assembly
People from Karbi Anglong district